Matthias Laurenz Gräff (also known as Matthias Laurenz Gräff Ilpenstein; born 19 July 1984) is an Austrian academic painter, private historian, politician, political activist and organizer of the non-partisan platform Dialog im Kamptal from Gars am Kamp.

Biography

Family
Matthias Laurenz Gräff was born into an Austrian family of several politics and artists. He is the child of Helmuth Gräff, an academic painter, and Martina Maria Gräff (née Gach), art professor, daughter of the architect Richard Gach and granddaughter of the chemist Richard Henke. In 2013 Gräff became a co-founder and chairman of the worldwide Graeff-family association (Familienverband Gräff-Graeff e.V.), and in the following year he organized the worldwide family reunion "530 Jahre Graeff" at the ancient Von Graben castle Kornberg, Styria.

Art
At the age of 17 Matthias Laurenz Gräff began to study illustration and graphic at the private New Design University St. Pölten, and in the following years he took part at the summer academy of Geras of Bernhard Hollemann and Arthur Redhead. From 2002 to 2008 he studied at Wolfgang Herzig's masterclass of painting at the University of Applied Arts Vienna. In 2010, at the 64th annual fair of St Pöltens Künstlerbund (Art union), he received the "Adolf Peschek Preis" (Adolf Peschek Public Award) in the Museum of the City of St. Pölten. Two years later Gräff created the painting for the vine etiquette of the Red Cross in Lower Austria. In 2013 he and his girlfriend Georgia Kazantzidu organized a concert of the Mojo Blues Band in his own hometown, Gars am Kamp. In the same year, upon the occasion of the celebration of the sister city Gars am Inn in Germany he created the officiel twin city painting.

In 2014, Gräff received from the mayor's bureau of Gars am Kamp a contract to create three paintings for the vine etiquettes "Garser Wein 2014". A local businessman boycott the publishing of the etiquettes about the illustration of a half naked woman, and this led to a little media scandal in Austria. Two years later, Gräff again received from the mayor's bureau of Gars am Kamp a contract to create three paintings for the vine etiquettes "Garser Wein 2016" (10 years Garser Wein). In 2015 and 2017, Gräff organized artist meetings with Nick Simper and Don Airey, musicians of Deep Purple in Vienna. In the same year together with Roger Glover he take part at "50 Years Deep Purple. Art and History" at Cologne. In 2017 he organized a charity campaign in favor of Polyneuropathy at WUK Vienna. In 2018 he gave an interview and a presentation about his work and life to Irene Gavala at the Greek radio station Poets radio. Gräff's various painting themes are also used internationally, for example in an article by Asle Toje, a member of the Norwegian Nobel Committee.

About his art
Elisabeth Voggeneder, Austrian curator and art historian:
 In Matthias Laurenz Gräff's paintings one finds the expression of Baroque elements. With the early age of 29 he has a huge extensive and varied Oeuvre. In observing his works one thinks of his paragons as Vincent van Gogh, Paul Cézanne and Claude Monet. In his still life paintings one can realize that he even rises above Cézanne in his target and design vocabulary. Gräff interprets this traditional theme in a new way and carries it in a new era.

Sabrina Redhead, art curator of the Red Bull "project spielberg":
 In Gräff's artworks you can obviously realize the influence of the Austrian art history especially the classical modern Art. His style is distinctive and significant. He achieves combination of traditional and modern in such a way that has not been seen before. He very often uses "pure" colours; this reminds us of Henri Matisse. He tends to be enormously dynamic, he generates moods and every view of his works allows new points of view and experiences. Although the variety of his perspective underlies Paul Cézanne, Pablo Picasso and Vincent van Gogh, his works are unique and peerless.

Political activism
Matthias Laurenz Gräff has been working on contemporary paintings of political and social criticism since 2015. These are published by international books, magazines and blogs. Important topics are anti-fascism, socialism, anti-nationalist, pro-European, liberalism and tradition. Gräff deals with national and global issues and personalities. He also deals with socio-political issues and critical processes in Austrian society and politics. The Erich Maria Remarque-Friedenszentrum (University of Osnabrück) wrote about Gräff: He consistently represents humanistic, anti-nationalist and pro-European positions both in his art and in various exchange and discussion programs organized by him.

In relation of the 2019 European Parliament election, Gräff created a pro-European painting in collaboration with the Austrian party NEOS.

In 2019 Matthias Laurenz Gräff and Georgia Kazantzidu created the non-partisan platform Dialog im Kamptal (Dialogue in Kamptal) as a private initiative for political communication and participation in his art studio. The events aim to inform, exchange and dialogue on relevant political, diplomatic and social issues. Erhard Busek, Wolfgang Brandstetter, Karin Kneissl, Hannes Swoboda, Emil Brix, Wolfgang Petritsch, Karl von Habsburg among other, took part in the events.

Matthias Laurenz Gräff has been politically active as a community representative in Gars am Kamp for the liberal NEOS party since 2022. He is also a candidate for the Lower Austrian state elections in 2023, a candidate for the Waldviertel region and as a candidate for the Horn district.

Exhibitions (selection)
 "Deep Purple - Art and History - The exhibition". Celebrating 50 years of Deep Purple, Kunsthalle Köln-Lindenthal/Ger
 "Benefizausstellung zugunsten Polyneuropathie", WUK, Vienna/AT
 "Garser Wein 2016", 10 years Garser wine at "Weinfest '16", Gars am Kamp
 "Der Anreiz des Seins, Allegorie - Stillleben - Landschaft", Kunst im Waldviertel, Kunst & Seminarhotel Geras/AT
 "Liebreizendes Griechenland", KunstSalon im Wiener Botschaftsviertel, Vienna/AT
 "Matthias Laurenz Gräff und Helmuth Gräff", Galerie Daliko, Krems an der Donau/AT
 Steirerschlössl Zeltweg, Red Bull Project Spielberg/AT
 Cityhall Korneuburg/AT
 Erstes österreichisches Museum für Alltagsgeschichte, Neupölla/AT
 Red Cross Lower Austria, Tulln an der Donau/AT
 Gaming Charterhouse/AT
 Siemens AG Headquarter, Linz/AT 
 St. Pöltner Künstlerbund, Museum of the City of St. Pölten/AT
 Galerie Austria/AT
 Advent im Wiener Rathaus 2008 and ORF (Austrian broadcaster), Vienna/AT
 Diplom exhibition 2008, University of Applied Arts, Vienna/AT
 Kunsthalle Wien-Karlsplatz project space, Vienna/AT

Collections (selection)
 Don Airey (Member of Deep Purple), England
 Dr. Alexander Van der Bellen, 12th President of Austria, Vienna/AT
 Community of Gars am Kamp/AT
 Nick Simper (Founding member of Deep Purple), England
 Embassy of Greece in Vienna/AT/GRE
 Schloss Kornberg Castle, collection of the Counts of Bardeau/Grafen von Bardeau/AT
 Community of Gars am Inn/GER
 Community of Neupölla/AT
 Red Cross of Lower Austria, Tulln an der Donau/AT
 Austrian Red Cross, Vienna/AT
 Mondi paper AG, AT
 Art Collection University of Applied Arts, Vienna/AT
 Geras Abbey, Geras/AT

References

Literature (selection)
 Mag. Sabrina Redhead, Ausstellungskatalog Kunst im Murtal" 2014, "Kunst - Tradition und Aufbruch" 2014, Ausstellung im Steirerschlössl Zeltweg, Red Bull Projekt Spielberg; accessed 7 August 2015. 
 Univ-Doz Dr. Friedrich Polleross: Gemälde von Matthias Laurenz Gräff im Museum in Neupölla. In: Das Waldviertel, herausgegeben vom Waldviertler Heimatbund 
 Helmuth Gräff, "Zwischen den Welten", Verlag Bibliothek der Provinz, pp. 134–35, 2008; accessed 7 August 2015. 
 Universität für Angewandte Kunst, Diplome Sommersemester 2007/08; accessed 7 August 2015. 
 "Parasite | Paradise", Interventionen zeitgenössischer Kunst auf Burg Forchtenstein, pp. 78–79; accessed 7 August 2015. 
 Vision magacine of China VISION Magacine, March 2006, "Metempsychosis of Art", p. 108/111; (Chinese)
 Matthias Laurenz Gräff. Allegorie-Stillleben-Landschaft; accessed 7 August 2015.

External links

 Official website (in German, English, Greek)
 Matthias Laurenz Gräff. Political and social critism paintings (in English)
 Profile, basis-wien.at; accessed 7 August 2015. 
 Profile, artfacts.net; accessed 22 September 2015. 
 Matthias Laurenz Gräff profile, kulturvernetzung.at; accessed 7 August 2015. 
 Universität Wien. Univ-Doz. Dr. Friedrich Polleroß: Gemälde von Matthias Laurenz Gräff im Museum in Neupölla; accessed 7 August 2015. 

1984 births
Living people
20th-century Austrian painters
Austrian male painters
21st-century Austrian painters
21st-century male artists
Political artists
Austrian political activists
People from Lower Austria
University of Applied Arts Vienna alumni
20th-century Austrian male artists